Food faddists (also known as pseudoscientific diet advocates) are people who promote fad diets or pseudoscientific dieting ideas. The following people are recognized as notable food faddists, either currently or historically.

A

Elliot Abravanel
Jessica Ainscough
Dan Dale Alexander
Rasmus Larssen Alsaker
Daniel Amen
Dave Asprey
Robert Atkins

B

William J. A. Bailey
Fereydoon Batmanghelidj
Luigi di Bella 
Sanford Bennett 
Henry G. Bieler
Maximilian Bircher-Benner
Russell Blaylock
Alfredo Bowman
William Brady
Paul Bragg 
Johanna Brandt
Eric R. Braverman
John R. Brinkley
Johanna Budwig

C
Kristina Carrillo-Bucaram
Hereward Carrington 
Paul Carton 
Deepak Chopra
Eugene Christian 
Hulda Regehr Clark
Gabriel Cousens

D

Peter J. D'Adamo 
Adelle Davis
Lorraine Day
Emmet Densmore 
Arnold DeVries
Edward H. Dewey
Marilyn Diamond
Susanna Way Dodds
Kurt Donsbach
George J. Drews

E

Webster Edgerly
Arnold Ehret 
August Engelhardt
St. Louis Estes

F

Horace Fletcher
Carlton Fredericks

G

Jesse Mercer Gehman
Max Gerson
Belle Gibson
Ann Louise Gittleman
Sylvester Graham 
Steven Gundry

H

Vani Hari
Gayelord Hauser
William Howard Hay
Linda Hazzard
Bob Hoffman 
Adolphus Hohensee
Patrick Holford

J

D. C. Jarvis
Jasmuheen 
Isaac Jennings
Adolf Just

K

William Donald Kelley
Willis Sharpe Kilmer
Henry Valentine Knaggs 
Lelord Kordel 
Catherine Kousmine
Morris Krok

L

Henry Lindlahr 
Benedict Lust

M

Aseem Malhotra
Judy Mazel 
Alfred W. McCann 
Frank McCoy 
John A. McDougall
Gillian McKeith
Joseph Mercola
Eustace Miles
Earl Mindell
Theodor Morell
James Morison
Michael Mosley

N
Mary Gove Nichols 
Gary Null

O
Mehmet Oz

P
Gwyneth Paltrow
James Martin Peebles 
David Perlmutter
Nicholas Perricone
Lydia Pinkham
Edward Earle Purinton

R
Andrea Rabagliati
Matthias Rath
Lair Ribeiro
John and Vera Richter
J. I. Rodale

S

Maureen Kennedy Salaman
Anthony Sattilaro
Gustav Schlickeysen 
Herbert M. Shelton
Walter Siegmeister
Lendon Smith 
Suzanne Somers
Alois P. Swoboda 
Edmund Bordeaux Szekely

T
Herman Taller
John Henry Tilden
Kevin Trudeau

V
Walter L. Voegtlin
Aajonus Vonderplanitz

W
Robert Walter
Joshua Ward
George S. Weger
Ann Wigmore
David Wolfe

Y
Robert O. Young

References

Lists of people by association
Lists of people by ideology